Yellowstone Lake State Park is a state park of Wisconsin, United States, featuring a  reservoir on a tributary of the Pecatonica River. The state park is included in the  Yellowstone Lake State Wildlife Area.  The park has 128 campsites and 5 group sites.   There is a swimming area with sand beach, picnic areas, and playgrounds. Boat launch, boat rentals, fishing for bluegill, largemouth bass, walleye and channel catfish, with some northern pike and muskellunge. Hiking trails, and groomed cross country ski trails. The adjacent 4,000 acre wildlife area offers extensive horse trails and a shooting range.

Located in the town of Fayette in Lafayette County, the man-made lake is sustained by the Yellowstone River which enters on the northwest side, and the man-made dike built on the southeast side. The dam at the southern end of the dike is crossed by a narrow, steel catwalk, from which fishing is not allowed.

External links
Yellowstone Lake State Park

1970 establishments in Wisconsin
IUCN Category V
Protected areas of Lafayette County, Wisconsin
Reservoirs in Wisconsin
State parks of Wisconsin
Protected areas established in 1970